Fascism is a political ideology.

Fascism may refer to:

Albanian fascism, a version of the ideology developed in Albania
American fascism, a version of the ideology developed in the United States 
Austrian fascism, a version of the ideology developed in Austria
British fascism, a version of the ideology developed in Britain
Croatian fascism, a version of the ideology developed in Croatia
French fascism, a version of the ideology developed in France
German fascism, a version of the ideology developed in Germany, commonly known as Nazism
Hungarian fascism, a version of the ideology developed in Hungary
Italian fascism, a version of the ideology developed in Italy
Religious fascism, a distinctive form of fascism with religious components
Christian fascism, a distinctive form of religious fascism 
Clerical fascism, a distinctive form of Christian fascism, merged with Clericalism
Islamic fascism, a distinctive form of religious fascism with Islamic components
Russian fascism (disambiguation), versions of the ideology developed in Russia
Social fascism, a political theory
Spanish fascism, a version of the ideology developed in Spain
Yugoslav fascism, a version of the ideology developed in Yugoslavia

Arts, entertainment, and media
Fascism (book), a nonfiction book edited by Roger Griffin
Fascism: A Warning, a 2018 book by Madeleine Albright

Other uses
Anti-fascism
Crypto-fascism
Eco-fascism
Fascist (insult)
Neo-fascism
Proto-fascism

See also 
Face-ism